State assembly elections were held in Malaysia on 22 April 1982 in all states except Sabah and Sarawak.

Results

Johore

Kedah

Kelantan

Malacca

Negri Sembilan

Pahang

Penang

Perak

Perlis

Selangor

Trengganu

References

State elections in Malaysia
state